In mathematics, Kronecker coefficients gλμν describe the decomposition of the tensor product (= Kronecker product) of two irreducible representations of a symmetric group into irreducible representations. They play an important role algebraic combinatorics and geometric complexity theory. They were introduced by Murnaghan in 1938.

Definition  
Given a partition λ of n, write Vλ for the Specht module associated to λ. Then the Kronecker coefficients gλμν are given by the rule

One can interpret this on the level of symmetric functions, giving a formula for the Kronecker product of two Schur polynomials:

This is to be compared with Littlewood–Richardson coefficients, where one instead considers the induced representation

and the corresponding operation of symmetric functions is the usual product. Also note that the Littlewood–Richardson coefficients are the analogue of the Kronecker coefficients for representations of GLn, i.e. if we write Wλ for the irreducible representation corresponding to λ (where λ has at most n parts), one gets that

Properties 

 showed that computing Kronecker coefficients is #P-hard and contained in GapP. A recent work by  shows that deciding whether a given Kronecker coefficient is non-zero is NP-hard. This recent interest in computational complexity of these coefficients arises from its relevance in the Geometric Complexity Theory program. 

A major unsolved problem in representation theory and combinatorics is to give a combinatorial description of the Kronecker coefficients. It has been open since 1938, when Murnaghan asked for such a combinatorial description. A combinatorial description would also imply that the problem is # P-complete in light of the above result.

The Kronecker coefficients can be computed as

where  is the character value of the irreducible representation corresponding to partition  on a permutation .

The Kronecker coefficients also appear in the generalized Cauchy identity

See also
Littlewood–Richardson coefficient

References

Algebraic combinatorics
Representation theory
Symmetric functions